Don J. Easterbrook is professor emeritus of Geology at Western Washington University.

Career
Easterbrook was educated at the University of Washington, where he received the BSc in 1958, the MSc in 1959, and the PhD (Geology) in 1962. His doctoral dissertation was entitled Pleistocene Geology of the Northern Part of the Puget Lowland, Washington. He was chairman of the Geology Department at Western Washington University for 12 years.

Easterbrook has conducted geologic research in the North Cascade Range, Puget Lowland, Columbia Plateau, Rocky Mts., New Zealand Alps, Argentine Andes, and various other parts of the world. His research has been funded by the National Science Foundation, U.S. Dept. of Interior, and several other governmental agencies.

Climate change
In 2006, Easterbrook claimed that, based on past trends, "the current warm cycle should end soon and global temperatures should cool slightly until about 2035", and "the total increase in global warming for the century should be ~0.3 °C, rather than the catastrophic warming of 3-6°C (4-11°F) predicted by the IPCC." In 2013, he testified that "global warming ended in 1998." Easterbrook's claims have been contradicted by temperature data.

Scientific Societies 
 President of the Quaternary Geology and Geomorphology Division of the Geological Society of America 
 Chairman of the 1977 National Geological Society of America meeting 
 U.S. representative to the United Nations International Geological Correlation Program 
 Associate Editor of the Geological Society of America Bulletin for 15 years
 Associate Editor of the Geomorphology International Journal
 Director of Field Excursions for the 2003 International Quaternary Association Congress
 Founder of the Pacific Coast Friends of the Pleistocene
 Founding member of American Quaternary Association

Awards 
 National award for ‘Distinguished Service to the Quaternary Geology and Geomorphology Division’, Geological Society of America 
 Lifetime Achievement Award, Northwest Geological Society

Publications
  Elsevier preview, Google preview

See also
 Global warming
 Global warming controversy

References

External links
 Don J. Easterbrook - Home
 Don J. Easterbrook - Publications: Global Climate Change

American geologists
Living people
Western Washington University faculty
1935 births
People from Whatcom County, Washington
Academics from Bellingham, Washington
Scientists from Bellingham, Washington